The 1937 season was the twenty-sixth season for Santos FC.

References

External links
Official Site 

Santos
1937
San